The  is the 23rd edition of the Japan Film Professional Awards. It awarded the best of 2013 in film and it took place on June 28, 2014 at Theatre Shinjuku in Tokyo.

Awards 
Best Film: Bozo
Best Director: Shūichi Okita (A Story of Yonosuke)
Best Actress: Atsuko Maeda (Tamako in Moratorium)
Best Actor: Kengo Kora (A Story of Yonosuke)
Best New Director: Ryōhei Watanabe (Shady)
Best New Encouragement: Cast of Koi no Uzu
Best New Actress: Mayuko Iwasa  (Cult, Passion)
Best New Male Actor: Shingo Mizusawa (Bozo)
Special: Tetsuaki Matsue (Flashback Memories 3D)

10 best films
 Bozo (Tatsushi Ōmori) 
 Koi no Uzu (Hitoshi Ōne)
 A Story of Yonosuke (Shūichi Okita)
 The Backwater (Shinji Aoyama)
 Flashback Memories 3D (Tetsuaki Matsue)
 Tamako in Moratorium (Nobuhiro Yamashita) 
 See You Tomorrow, Everyone (Yoshihiro Nakamura)
 Hello, My Dolly Girlfriend (Takashi Ishii)
 A Band Rabbit and a Boy (Takuji Suzuki)
 Real (Kiyoshi Kurosawa)

References

External links
  

Japan Film Professional Awards
2014 in Japanese cinema
Japan Film Professional Awards
June 2014 events in Japan